Gorka-Kokuy is a rural locality (a village) in Niginskoye Rural Settlement, Nikolsky District, Vologda Oblast, Russia. The population was 15 as of 2002.

Geography 
Gorka-Kokuy is located 26 km northwest of Nikolsk (the district's administrative centre) by road. Levkin is the nearest rural locality.

References 

Rural localities in Nikolsky District, Vologda Oblast